Mountain View Hospital is a JCAHO accredited, 124-bed hospital in Payson, Utah, which has provided medical care to the south Utah County community from its current location for more than 30 years. The hospital was started in 1914 by Dr. A.L. Curtis above the Wilson Drug Store in Payson.

References

Hospitals in Utah County, Utah
Buildings and structures in Payson, Utah
MountainStar Healthcare
Hospitals established in 1914
HCA Healthcare